Pradip Kumar Bose is an Indian cyclist. He competed in the individual and team road race events at the 1952 Summer Olympics.

References

External links
 

1935 births
Possibly living people
Sportspeople from West Bengal
Indian male cyclists
Olympic cyclists of India
Cyclists at the 1952 Summer Olympics
Place of birth missing (living people)